Urimai Geetham is a 1988 Indian Tamil-language thriller film directed by R. V. Udayakumar, in his directorial debut. The film stars Prabhu and Karthik. It was released on 26 February 1988. Udayakumar won the Best New Dace (Director) award at the 9th Cinema Express Awards.

Plot 

Bhoominathan, an honest politician, wins the election and becomes the CM. A felicitation function is organised to celebrate his victory. In the function, he is assassinated by Thyagu. On the one hand, Thyagu is arrested and he denies having killed Bhoominathan. On the other hand, Boominathan's son, Chandru is determined to find his father's murderer. The rest of the story is what happens to Thyagu and Chandru who is the real culprit.

Cast 
Prabhu as Thyagu
Karthik as Chandru
Pallavi as Indhu
Ranjini as Ganga
Charuhasan as Bhoominathan
Typist Gopu
Janagaraj as Ezhumalai
Kumarimuthu
G. Srinivasan as Dharmaraj
M. N. Rajam as Thyagu's mother

Soundtrack 
The soundtrack was composed by the duo Manoj–Gyan, with lyrics written by R. V. Udayakumar.

Reception 
Jeyamanmadhan of Kalki said the director took an innovative story and mixed it with routine masala.

References

External links 
 

1980s Tamil-language films
1988 directorial debut films
1988 films
Films directed by R. V. Udayakumar
Films scored by Manoj–Gyan
Indian thriller films